Abkari is a 1988 Malayalam movie starring Mammootty and Ratheesh in the title roles. It was written by T. Damodaran and was directed by I. V. Sasi.

Plot
Vasu and Chacko are working as drivers and low ranking workers for the Abkari contractor Sreekandan. Sreekandan is heavily involved in the smuggling of liquor from the neighbouring state of Tamil Nadu in order to increase the already high profits in his business.  Chacko once makes an incorrect move to seduce the wife of Sreekandan, hoping that she is just waiting for any new man to come into her love life. But she only wanted to have an affair with Vasu.  Sreekandan learns of this, and Chacko is beaten black and blue and expelled from the organisation.

For some time the jobless youngsters try illegal brewing of hooch. But the Excise soon rounds them up. Kaimal, an Excise officer who has a past enmity with Sreekandan, meets up with the two young men. He encourages them to join the liquor trade as Abkaris. Kaimal takes the responsibility of helping them, even to generate the initial capital. Both Vasu and Chacko forms up a company "VASCO" and participates in the first Abkari range auction. Sreekandan who used to regularly win at the auction is defeated.

The growth of VASCO is phenomenal and with good support from Excise officials the business is flourishing. Vasu and Chacko, who once lived in a slum, move into palatial bungalows and now live a life of luxury. Sreekandan introduces a double-agent (Sankaradi) into their midst who promises them to make spurious Brandy. On a festival day this spurious liquor is served and many people are maimed for life or die. Vasu and Chacko then get Sreekandan killed.

The in-fighting, the criminal cases and the business pressures begin to take a toll on Vasu. Chacko in the meantime starts to like the rich life and squanders his wealth. Vasu always finds solace in Kunjappan, another Abkari contractor who wants the liquor business to be conducted in an ethical manner. Kunjappan, who came from humble origins, always reminds Vasu that he should never forget his past. Kunjappan, now rich, still maintains the small, old hut in which he was born, as a constant reminder of his past.

Vasu and Chacko also step into the domains (Abkari ranges) of other contractors. Until then, every contractor had his business area chalked out with others not contesting for these areas. But Vasu and Chacko started to bid for each and every possible range. The business understanding of Abkaris was broken. Soon the other contractors coalesced and plotted against Vasu and Chacko.

Chacko, who is reckless in financial dealings, loses a huge sum of money when he pays in advance for spirit which is never delivered. Chacko's daughter falls in love with their chauffeur, who comes from humble surroundings. The chauffeur is threatened but he continues the affair. So an angry Vasu kills him. This murder lands Vasu in trouble, as well. With a severe financial crunch and a major criminal case, the partners of VASCO find their situation unrecoverable. Chacko commits suicide, and Vasu pleads guilty to the murder and goes to prison. VASCO, a once formidable business empire, collapses.

Cast
Mammootty as Vasu
Ratheesh as Chacko
Urvashi as Sridevi
Parvathy as Sharada
Thiagarajan as KRC / Chidambaram
M. G. Soman as Kunjappan
Balan K. Nair as Chathunny
Jalaja as Ammini
T. G. Ravi as Sreekandan
Jayamalini as Kanakam
Kuthiravattam Pappu as Kumaran
Janardhanan as Karthikeyan
Devan as Jayaprakash (excise officer)
Prathapachandran as Kaimal (excise officer)
Vincent as Chandran, Police Officer
Kundara Johny as Peethambaran
Sankaradi as Govindan
Paravoor Bharathan as Swamy
C. I. Paul as George
Kunchan as Mani
Valsala Menon as Madhavi
Tony as Radhakrishnan
Santhakumari

Release
The film was released on 14 April 1988.

Box office
The film was a Super Hit and trendsetter.

References

External links
 

1988 films
1980s Malayalam-language films
Films directed by I. V. Sasi